Hung Hom is a  railway station in Hung Hom, Kowloon, Hong Kong. The station is one of four Hong Kong ports of entry on the MTR network; the others are Lo Wu, Lok Ma Chau, and West Kowloon. As the station is located next to the Cross-Harbour Tunnel's northern portal, it is also served by many cross-harbour bus routes.

Opened as the new southern terminus of the Kowloon–Canton Railway (KCR) on 30 November 1975 by Queen Elizabeth II, the station was originally named Kowloon station after the older terminus of the same name, which it replaced. The station was substantially expanded in the 1990s, at which time it was given its present name. The KCR British Section was also renamed KCR East Rail in order to differentiate it from the new KCR West Rail, which opened on 20 December 2003 and was extended to Hung Hom station on 16 August 2009.

As part of the Sha Tin to Central Link project, the East Rail line was extended across Victoria Harbour to Admiralty via a new immersed tube tunnel to the south of Hung Hom. The West Rail line was also extended via eastern Kowloon to connect to the former , with the combined line being renamed "".

History

Former Hung Hom station 
 once existed on Chatham Road South. It was situated on the former coastline of Hung Hom Bay, at the southeastern corner of the Gun Club Hill Barracks (between the current-day Chung Sze Yuen Building A of the Hong Kong Polytechnic University and the Hong Kong History Museum).

This old Hung Hom station, a temporary wooden structure, operated from 1 October 1910 (the day the Kowloon–Canton Railway began operation) It was later demolished.

Relocation of Kowloon station 

The  in Tsim Sha Tsui began operation in   After decades of economic growth in Hong Kong, the station, situated at the seafront of Victoria Harbour, became too small and had no room for expansion. A new Kowloon station (the current Hung Hom station), situated to the east, was officially inaugurated by Chief Secretary Denys Roberts on 24 November 1975 as the new terminus of the Kowloon–Canton Railway. However, it did not start operating until a few days later. The old terminal at Tsim Sha Tsui was closed on 29 November 1975. 

The first passenger train pulled out of the new station the following morning at 8:26 am. On 5 May 1975, Queen Elizabeth II unveiled a plaque commemorating the opening of the new terminal. The new station cost HK$150 million and offered modern new facilities including a spacious waiting hall, a restaurant, a bar, a bookstore, a bank, escalators, and closed circuit television. It was built along with a bus terminus and a multi-storey car park.

The controversial demolition of the old station commenced on 7 June 1978; a new complex of a concert hall and museums were built on Kowloon station's original site, but the clock tower was preserved as a Declared Monument.

Through trains to mainland China started running from Hung Hom station on 4 April 1979.

Renaming and expansion 

The new station was renamed Hung Hom station around February or March 1996. The Kowloon–Canton Railway was renamed KCR East Rail in 1996, and subsequently the  upon the merger of the MTR (metro services) and the Kowloon-Canton Railway (suburban train services) in December 2007.

A HK$1.3 billion expansion of Hung Hom station began on 16 March 1995, which included a new concourse designed by Foster and Partners. The expansion was completed in 1998. The passenger terminal now hosts ticket offices, waiting areas, shops and restaurants.

After decades of being the terminus station of the East Rail line, Hung Hom temporarily became an intermediate station when the East Rail was extended to East Tsim Sha Tsui station in 2004. On 16 August 2009, East Tsim Sha Tsui was transferred to the West Rail line. Hung Hom became the terminus station of both railway lines.

To minimise confusion after the opening of Hong Kong West Kowloon, China Railways renamed the station on its systems to Hong Kong Hung Hom (previously Jiulong / Kowloon) on 1 April 2019.

The West Rail line was relocated to a new set of platforms on 20 June 2021, a week ahead of the Tuen Ma line's inauguration. At the same time, the original East Rail line platforms were closed permanently to passengers, and are now used as train sidings. It is now an intermediate station on both lines.

Cross-border services 

China Railway has referred to the station as "Hong Kong Hung Hom" since 1 April 2019.

As of 4 September 2019, Hung Hom station and its cross-border services cannot be found on China Railways official website, as opposed to high speed services at West Kowloon station.

Sha Tin to Central Link expansion

Background 

To facilitate this expansion, new platforms were built underneath the Hung Hom station Exit C concourse. The Tuen Ma line platforms sit above the East Rail line platforms. New approach tracks have also been built north and south of the station.

Construction safety scandal 
In 2018, a major scandal emerged regarding construction malpractice at the Hung Hom station construction site. In 2015, contractors building the concrete slab forming the Tuen Ma line platform level reportedly cut off the ends of reinforcing bars that were supposed to be screwed into couplers within the diaphragm wall forming the side of the underground station box. The contractor then poured the concrete even though the bars were not connected to the couplers. As a result, engineers have cast doubt on the long-term structural safety of the slab.

The government has demanded that MTR Corporation submit a report on the safety of the station. An independent engineer, C M Wong & Associates Ltd., will conduct safety tests. On 12 June 2018, Chief Executive Carrie Lam announced that she will appoint a commission on inquiry, headed by Hong Kong judge Michael Hartmann, to investigate the scandal.

Station layout

Exits
An interchange for buses (lower level) and public light buses and taxis (upper level) is located outside the station building. The lower-level bus station is situated at the Kowloon entrance of the Cross-Harbour Tunnel. Elevated walkways connect the station to the Hong Kong Coliseum; Hong Kong Polytechnic University; the residential area of Hung Hom; and tourist attractions in eastern Tsim Sha Tsui, such as the Science Museum and the Avenue of Stars along Victoria Harbour.

 A1 – Hong Kong Polytechnic University
 A2 – Bus terminus on On Wan Road
 A3 – Northeast side of station
 B1 – Walkway to Hung Hom, Royal Peninsula, Harbour Place, Whampoa Garden
 B2 – Walkway to Exit C Concourse
 C1 – Bus Terminal; cross-harbour taxi stand
 C2 – Airport Express shuttle stand; walkway to Harbour Plaza Metropolis, Fortune Metropolis, Metropolis Residence, Metropolis Tower
 C3 – Taxi stand on Cheong Wan Road; Hong Kong Coliseum
 D1 – Walkway to Tsim Sha Tsui East and Hong Kong Polytechnic University
 D2, D3, D4 – Hong Kong Coliseum
 D5 – Tsim Sha Tsui Promenade
 D6 – Walkway to Exit C Concourse

References

External links 

 MTR Intercity Through Train e-Ticketing Services

Hung Hom
MTR stations in Kowloon
East Rail line
West Rail line
Sha Tin to Central Link
Tuen Ma line
Former Kowloon–Canton Railway stations
Railway stations in Hong Kong opened in 1975
1975 establishments in Hong Kong
Stations on the Beijing–Kowloon Railway